Buyer's Remorse may refer to:

Buyer's remorse, the sense of regret after making a purchase
Buyer's Remorse (book), 2016 book by Bill Press
"Buyer's Remorse", the third episode of The Mayor
"Buyer's Remorse", an episode from the second season of Rules of Engagement